Jean-Jacques de Mesmes, comte d'Avaux, vicomte de Neufchâtel (1630–1688) was a French magistrate, intendant of Soissons, and Président à mortier of the Parlement of Paris. He developed the town of Avaux-la-Ville, which is now called Asfeld. He was a member of the Académie française. He was brother of Jean-Antoine de Mesmes, the diplomat, and father of Jean-Antoine de Mesmes, the premier president of the Parlement of Paris.

Birth and origins 

Jean-Jacques was born in 1630, or there about, probably in Paris. He was the eldest of the four sons of Jean-Antoine de Mesmes and his wife Anne Courtin. His birth year is sometimes given as 1640, which cannot be as it is well established that his youngest brother was born that year.

His father was comte d'Avaux and a president at the Parlement of Paris. His mother was a daughter of Francois Courtin, seigneur de Brusselles and baron de Givry.

Jean-Jacques also had a sister, Antoinette, who became a Carmelite nun

Jean-Jacques de Mesmes, the president, the subject of this article, may easily be confused with other members of his family who share the same name, notably his grandfather Jean-Jacques de Mesmes, sieur de Roissy (died 1642) and his youngest son Jean-Jacques de Mesmes, knight of Malta (died 1741).

Noble titles 
On 23 February 1673 Jean-Jacques de Mesmes became the fourth comte d'Avaux at his father's death. The Latin inscription on the portrait by Antoine Masson in 1683 calls him 'Comes d'Avaux. This is important because his youngest brother, Jean-Antoine, the diplomat, also claimed to be comte d'Avaux. Using a regnal number in the Parisian branch of the de Mesmes family, he is called Jean-Jacques III de Mesmes.

He was also vicomte de Neufchâtel, and seigneur de . The title of vicomte de Neufchâtel was used as a courtesy title by his eldest son, Jean-Antoine, while Jean-Jacques was still alive.

Avaux-la-Ville 
In 1671 Jean-Jacques de Mesmes enlarged his estate at Avaux en Champagne by buying the neighbouring fief of Écry. He then developed the village of Écry to a small town and renamed it Avaux-la-Ville, while Avaux became Avaux-le-Château. This new town is today known as Asfeld after Claude Francois Bidal d'Asfeld, who bought the county of Avaux in 1728.

With the village came the old castle of Écry or Escry, which he extended and transformed. In 1683 Jean-Jacques de Mesmes asked the architect François Romain to build a new church in Avaux-la-Ville. An Italian baroque style and an unusual design were adopted. The church's footprint is said to have the form of a viola da gamba. It has a pentagonal dome. The church is dedicated to Saint-Didier.

Career 
Jean-Jacques de Mesmes pursued a judicial and administrative career. He became conseiller au parlement, maître des requêtes, et conseiller d'état. In 1672 he was given his father's place as président à mortier at the parlement of Paris. He also became intendant of Soissons. It is often said that he participated in the signing of the Treaties of Nijmegen but this seems to be due to a confusion with his brother Jean-Antoine, the diplomat.

Order of the Holy Spirit 
On 20 September 1671 Jean-Jacques de Mesmes became Provost and Master of Ceremonies of the Ordre des Chevaliers du Saint-Esprit. He obtained this office from Macé de Bertrand de la Bazinière (1632-1688), his father-in-law.

His portrait, painted and engraved by Antoine Masson in 1683, shows Jean-Jacques de Mesmes in the robes of a président à mortier with the cross of the Order of the Holy Spirit on its cordon bleu around his neck. On 17 February 1684 he resigned from this office and sold it to his younger brother Jean-Antoine, the diplomat.

Académie française 
He was a learned man and had travelled to Italy. He owned a large library, for which he engaged Lucas Holstenius as librarian. In 1676 he was elected to the Académie française, becoming the second occupant of Seat 4. He was elected due to his reputation and the influence of his family. He was no famous writer of French literature. His inauguration speech was his only work ever to be printed. His son Jean-Antoine would also be an academician (elected in 1710).

Marriage and children 
On 8 March 1660 Jean-Jacques married Marguerite Bertrand de la Bazinière, daughter of Macé Bertrand de la Bazinière (1632–1688), trésorier de l'Épargne.

 
Jean-Jacques and Marguerite had five children: three sons and two daughters:

 Jean-Antoine (1661–1723), succeeded him as comte d'Avaux and became first president of the Parlement of Paris
 Marie-Thérèse (born 1668), married François de la Roche, marquis de Fontenille
 Judith-Amasie (born 1672), became a nun
 Jean-Jacques (1675–1741), became a Knight of St John

Death, succession, and timeline 

At his death his heirs made a plan how to keep his office as président à mortier in the family. This particular post at the parlement de Paris had been in the de Mesmes family since his paternal uncle Henri had obtained it and had passed from Henri to his youngest paternal uncle Jean-Antoine and then to him. It would be best if it could be passed to his son Jean-Antoine, but this son had just been named conseiller au parlement and still needed to become maître de requêtes before he could become président à mortier. They then wondered whether his youngest brother Jean-Antoine, the diplomat, could hold this office until his son was ready for it. His son Jean-Antoine was nevertheless promoted to président à mortier without ever having been a maître de recherches.

At his death the heirs sold the townhouse built by Claude de Mesmes's in the Marais Quarter of Paris to Paul de Beauvilliers, Duke of Saint-Aignan. It thus became known as the Hôtel Beauvilliers and later the Hôtel de Saint-Aignan.

Notes and references

Notes

Citations

Sources 
  – Knights of the Order of the Holy Spirit and general index
 
  – 1687 to 1689
  – K to Z
  – (for timeline) – (for timeline)
 
  – M to N
 
  – 1703

External links 
 Racines Histoire
 Speech by Jean-Jacques de Mesmes at the Académie française

1630 births
1688 deaths
Members of the Académie Française